Niangzi Pass, also called the Ladies' Pass, is a mountain pass west of Shijiazhuang, capital of Hebei Province in North China.

Surrounded by a maze of hills and valleys, Niangziguan Pass was famed as "the Ninth Pass on the Great wall". The extant pass was built in 1542 during the Ming Dynasty.  The pass is flanked by hills more than 1,000 metres high. A river, the Tao River, twists its way through the valleys below. In ancient times this provided a narrow passage for men and horses.

Legend goes that during the Tang Dynasty, the army under the command of Princess Pingyang, daughter of Li Yuan, the first emperor of the Tang Dynasty, once garrisoned here. Hence the name "Ladies Pass."

Its defence played an important part in the Battle of Xinkou between the Chinese Nationalists and the Japanese.

Mountain passes of China
Great Wall of China
Landforms of Hebei
Landforms of Shanxi